Leptochiloides is a small nearctic genus of potter wasps known from dry areas in South-Western North America. They have some structural similarities with members of the genus Pterocheilus, including the pilose labial palpi.

References

Biological pest control wasps
Potter wasps